The Fleetwings A-1 was an American target drone manufactured by Kaiser-Fleetwings.

Design
The A-1 was built around 1940 as a small aerial gunnery target, probably designed specifically for this purpose. It was flown unmanned and controlled by radio commands from the ground. The number of A-1s built is unknown, but the target was most likely retired by mid-1941.

Specifications

References

External links

1940s United States special-purpose aircraft
Unmanned aerial vehicles of the United States
Fleetwings aircraft